Johanna Konta was the defending champion after winning the last event in 2015, but chose to participate in Cincinnati instead.

Maryna Zanevska won the title after defeating Danka Kovinić 5–7, 6–1, 6–3 in the final.

Seeds

Draw

Finals

Top half

Bottom half

References
Main Draw

Odlum Brown Vancouver Open
Vancouver Open